Westringia blakeana is a flowering plant in the family Lamiaceae and grows in New South Wales and Queensland. It is a small shrub with mauve to whitish flowers with brown spots and leaves arranged in whorls.

Description
Flowering may occur throughout the year though mostly in spring.

Taxonomy and naming
Westringia blakeana was first formally described in 1949 by Joseph Robert Bernard Boivin from a specimen collected by Stanley Thatcher Blake in Lamington National Park at an altitude of 2,400 feet, and the description was published in Proceedings of the Royal Society of Queensland.

Distribution and habitat
This westringia  grows in wet sclerophyll forest and rainforest edges, often near streams or waterfalls in north-eastern New South Wales and south-eastern Queensland.

References

 
blakeana
Lamiales of Australia
Flora of New South Wales
Flora of Queensland
Plants described in 1949